ContourGlobal plc is a British power generation business. It was listed on the London Stock Exchange until it was acquired by Kohlberg Kravis Roberts in December 2022.

History
The company was established by Joseph Brandt with financial support from Reservoir Capital Group in 2005. In June 2015 it purchased the Vorotan Cascade in Armenia for US$180 million. ContourGlobal was the subject of an initial public offering which raised net proceeds of £281 million in November 2017. It then agreed to acquire Acciona's solar power plants for US$1.19 billion in February 2018.

In May 2022, the board accepted an offer from Kohlberg Kravis Roberts which valued the company at £1.75 billion. It was announced on 16 December 2022 that the court had approved the takeover, allowing the transaction to be completed.

Operations
The company generates circa 59% of its power from traditional sources of fuel such as natural gas and coal and circa 41% from renewable sources such as wind, solar and water. It owns and operates 69 power generation plants across 19 countries.

References

External links
 Official site

Companies established in 2005
Companies listed on the London Stock Exchange